Court Street Historic District may refer to:

 Court Street Historic District (West Point, Mississippi), listed on the NRHP in Mississippi
 Court Street Historic District (Binghamton, New York), listed on the NRHP in New York
 Court Street Historic District (Plattsburgh, New York), listed on the NRHP in New York